The 1975 Oregon Webfoots football team represented the University of Oregon in the Pacific-8 Conference (Pac-8) during the 1975 NCAA Division I football season. Led by second-year head coach Don Read, the Ducks were  overall  in the Pac-8, 

Oregon defeated Utah of the WAC in late October to break a 14-game losing streak, the nation's longest  They won the next week at Washington State, and the season-ending Civil War over Oregon State, the final game for Beavers' head coach Dee Andros, only his second loss in the rivalry in his

Schedule

Roster

Game summaries

Oregon State

Statistics

Passing

Rushing

Receiving

References

External links
 Game program: Oregon at Washington State – November 1, 1975
 Game video (color) – Oregon at Washington State – November 1, 1975

Oregon
Oregon Ducks football seasons
Oregon Webfoots football